Talipexole (B-HT920, Domnin) is a dopamine agonist that is marketed as a treatment for Parkinson's Disease in Japan by Boehringer Ingelheim; it was introduced in 1996.  As of December 2014 it was not approved for marketing in the US nor in Europe.  

Talipexole is a D2 dopamine receptor agonist and interacts both pre- and post-synaptic receptors. It also is an  α2-adrenergic agonist.

The main side effects are drowsiness, dizziness, hallucinations and minor gastrointestinal complaints.  In 2008 the Japanese Ministry of Health, Labour, and Welfare mandated that Boehringer add a warning to the label concerning the risk of sudden onset of sleep.

Synthesis

The N-alkylation of azepan-4-one [105416-56-6] (1) with allyl bromide in the presence of potassium carbonate gives 1-allyl-azepan-4-one (2). This is halogenated with molecular bromine in acetic acid to give 1-allyl-5-bromohexahydro-4-azepinone (3). The last step involves cyclization with thiourea (4) in refluxing ethanol, completing the synthesis of talipexole (5).

See also
B-HT-958 [83718-64-3]
Azepexole [36067-73-9]
Pramipexole

References 

Alpha-1 blockers
Alpha-2 adrenergic receptor agonists
Allyl compounds
Azepanes
D2-receptor agonists
Dopamine agonists
Thiazoles